Geopathology (also Geopathy) is a theory that links the Earth's inherent radiation with the health of humans, animals and plants.

The term is derived from Greek γεω- (geō-), combining form of γῆ (gê, “earth”)
and πάθος (páthos, “suffering”) - ie pathology, widely used to describe infirmities.

The term is more widely used in the adjectival form ie 'geopathic' (sometimes 'geopathological') and often linked to 'stress', creating the terms 'geopathic stress' and 'geostress'.

Gustav Frieherr von Pohl has been described as the modern 'father' of geopathic stress. von Pohl conducted a study in the Bavarian town of Vilsbiburg in 1929 which purported to link focus points of 'earth-radiation' ger. Erdstrahlen with incidence of cancer.

Ley lines (a supposition introduced by Alfred Watkins in 1925) have also been suggested to create geopathic stress.

Geopathic stress (GS) 
It is suggested that the Earth has a natural vibration, but features like underground watercourses, drainage pipes, underground tunnels and even simple geological faults distort this vibration. Such distorted vibrations are held to rise upwards through the Earth's surface and create an pernicious effect on the health and/or behaviour of all biological life. The distortions are amplified during night hours  and consequently the impact is greater if the focal point of the adverse radiation is a bedroom, also noting that the subject, during the time of sleep, will be continually located in the path of such radiation.

Published academic papers and research

External links 
 https://www.irishexaminer.com/breakingnews/lifestyle/healthandlife/geopathic-stress-just-for-the-gullible-863019.html
 https://www.theguardian.com/science/head-quarters/2015/aug/20/bad-vibrations-whats-the-evidence-for-geopathic-stress

Further reading 
 Rolf Gordon Are You Sleeping In A Safe Place?, 1989 
 Paul Craddock, Geopathic Stress & Electropolution: How to Protect Your Health & Home, 2016 
 Ulrike Banis, Geopathic Stress - and what you can do about it, 2003 
 Robert Egby, The Silent Killer Below: Hunting and Healing Geopathic Stress, 2018 
 Judy Hall, Crystal Prescriptions volume 3: Crystal solutions to electromagnetic pollution and geopathic stress. An A-Z guide, 2014 
 Louise Weidel GEOPATHIC ZONES : Earth Energy Lines & Electosmog Force Fields & Trees, 2002 
 Barry Smith, NOWHERE TO HIDE: Electromagnetic radiation, 2020 
 David Cowan and Rodney Girdlestone, Safe as Houses?: Ill Health and Electro-stress in the Home, 1996 
 Glen Swartwout, Electromagnetic Pollution Solutions, 2012 
 
 Gregory A Storozuk, Geopathic zones and the iron stake method, 1992 
 
 
 Blanche Merz Die Seele des Ortes. Deren Wirkkraft auf unsere vier Körper (eng. The soul of the place. Effect on our four bodies). Herold, München 1988, 
Later edition: Die Seele des Ortes. Metaphysische Energien und ihre Wirkkraft (eng. The soul of the place. Metaphysical Energy and its Effect). AT, Aarau 2000, 
 Ernst Hartmann, Geopathie (eng. Geopathy), Haug Verlag, Ulm/Donau, 1954.
 Ernst Hartmann, Krankheit als Standortproblem (eng. Illness as a Location Problem), Volume 1, Haug Verlag, Heidelberg, (1. Auflage 1964), 5. Auflage 1986, 
 Ernst Hartmann, Krankheit als Standortproblem (eng. Illness as a Location Problem), Volume 2, Haug Verlag, Heidelberg, 1986, 
 Gustav Freiherr von Pohl, Erdstrahlen als Krankheits - und Krebserreger, (eng. Earth Currents as Pathogens of Illness and Development of Cancer), 1932; modern edition 
 Hubert Palm, Das gesunde Haus: Unser naher Umweltschutz, (eng. The healthy house; our closest environmental protection) 1975; 1992 edition

See also 
 Dowsing
 Electromagnetic radiation and health
 Geobiology (pseudoscience)
 Radiesthesia
 List of topics characterised as pseudoscience

References 

Pseudoscience